Dr. Kamala Kanta Kalita is an Indian politician and General Secretary of the Asom Gana Parishad. Dr. Kalita was Health and Family welfare Minister of Assam two times and a member of the Assam Legislative Assembly from the  Chaygaon constituency in Kamrup district.

References 

Asom Gana Parishad politicians
Living people
Assam MLAs 1985–1991
Assam MLAs 1991–1996
Assam MLAs 1996–2001
Assam MLAs 2006–2011
People from Kamrup district
Year of birth missing (living people)